General elections were held in the Solomon Islands in May and June 1970, the first to the new Governing Council. Most candidates ran as independents.

Background
The new Governing Council consisted of seventeen elected members (increased from fourteen in the Legislative Council), six civil servants (down from twelve) and three ex officio members, the first time a Solomon Islands legislature had an elected majority. The Council was to be chaired by the High Commissioner.

Rather than introducing cabinet government, the new constitution provided for government by committee, which was deemed more in line with Melanesian culture of reaching agreement by consensus rather than majority vote. The Governing Council had five committees, which were responsible for Communications and Works, Education and Social Welfare, Finance, Health and Internal Affairs, and Natural Resources.

Results

Appointed members

Aftermath
The newly elected Council met for the first time on 15 July. Gordon Siama was appointed chair of the Communications and Works committee, Willie Betu became chair of the Education and Social Welfare committee, Tom Russell (Financial Secretary) became chair of the Finance committee, Roy Davies was appointed chair of the Health and Internal Affairs committee, and David Kausimae became chair of the Natural Resources committee.

Joseph Bryan, who lost by 20 votes in East Guadalcanal, lodged a petition against the election results, claiming that the votes cast at two polling stations had been rejected as they contained markings that could identify the voter. The High Court heard the petition on 10 August; with the Returning Officer and winning candidate Leone Laku failing to lodge objections, the court annulled the result and ordered a by-election to be held. The by-election took place on 10 October, with Bryan winning with 977 votes; Laku finished second with 362.

In 1971 Silas Sitai was appointed 'shadow chairman', becoming the first Speaker of the legislature.

References

1970 in the Solomon Islands
Elections in the Solomon Islands
Solomons
Governing Council of the Solomon Islands
Election and referendum articles with incomplete results